Hafiz Hayat is a place in district of Gujrat, Pakistan. It is named after a local Sufi saint Hafiz Muhammad Hayat.

History 
Hafiz Muhammad Hayat travelled from Delhi to Wazirabad during the Mughal period. He was advised by a saint, Baqi Shah, to settle across the Chenab River near the fort of Raja Kaladhv. The fort was surrounded by a dense forest and it was later settled by Hafiz Hayat when he aided people with his spiritual aura. Though the exact dates are unknown but according to one tradition it was at the time of Emperor Jahangir when the saint contributed his entire land holding to the then state for the cause of education. The main campus of University of Gujrat has been constructed on the land donated by Hafiz Muhammad Hayat and is named after him.

Shrine of Hafiz Hayat 
The shrine of Hafiz Hayat rests on a mound six feet high above the plain. The site consists of a haveli, baradari, mosque, four tombs of different proportions, some graves, seven waterholes and old trees. The place was initially the property of the then ruler Raja Kaladhvi.

References

Populated places in Gujrat District
Shrines in Pakistan